The National Liberation Army ( jaysh al-taḥrīr al-waṭanī al-lībī), officially the National Liberation Armed Forces of the Free Libyan Republic, formerly known as the Free Libyan Army, was a Libyan military organisation affiliated with the National Transitional Council, which was constituted during the First Libyan Civil War by defected military members and civilian volunteers, in order to engage in battle against both remaining members of the Libyan Armed Forces and paramilitia loyal to the rule of Muammar Gaddafi. It had prepared for some time in portions of Eastern Libya controlled by the anti-Gaddafi forces for eventual full-on combat in Western Libya against pro-Gaddafi militants, training many men before beginning to go on the offensive. They have battled for control of Benghazi, Misrata, Brega, Ajdabiya, Zawiya and Ra's Lanuf as well as several towns in the Nafusa Mountains. They finally began the Battle for Tripoli in August 2011 when they attacked from the west of the city, as well as fomenting an internal uprising on 20 August.

There were claims that there were 8,000 soldiers in Benghazi equipped with a substantial number of weapons captured from abandoned Libyan army depots, including AK-47 and FN FAL rifles, RPGs, SPGs, anti-aircraft guns and several tanks.

The force was formerly named the Free Libyan Army, but it was changed at the end of May 2011 to "help better define the increasingly professional and disciplined military efforts to overcome the Gaddafi regime", according to a statement released by the National Transitional Council. It uses the tricolour flag first adopted by Libya in 1951, which has become emblematic of the Libyan Republic and the revolt against Gaddafi; considering that the flag is the same sign of Libya's independence and freedom from the Italian occupation.

The NLA finally succeeded in defeating the last pro-Gaddafi remnants on 20 October 2011, during heavy fighting in Sirte, and captured Muammar Gaddafi himself, who later died of bullet wounds after his capture, effectively ending the Libyan civil war. The current status of the organisation following the Libyan provisional government's "declaration of liberation" was its reorganization into the Libyan National Army.

2011 transitional period and restructuring
As of November 2011, the National Transitional Council is in the process of restructuring the army, with military personnel who defected from the Gaddafi regime and former rebel fighters of the National Liberation Army forming the basis is the new Libyan National Army. Major General Khalifa Haftar was chosen as the overall commander of the new Libyan Army due to his military experience and loyalty to the revolution that overthrew Gaddafi.

The Libyan Army only numbered "a few thousand" trained soldiers in November 2011, and was rapidly trying to train up new fighters who could keep the peace nationwide and deter rogue militias from acting without NTC orders, and was responsible for brokering a ceasefire on at least one occasion in November between warring militas from Zawiya and Al Maya.
On 1 December 2011, it was reported that the National Liberation Army was to integrate up to 50,000 former rebel fighters into the new Libyan national army and police forces, with the aid of French training, with long-term aims to integrate as many as 200,000 fighters from the brigades that had fought against Gaddafi during the civil war.

In December 2011, Turkey agreed to provide training to the Libyan Army as it attempted to reorganize in the aftermath of the civil war.

Also in December, large numbers of former rebels were being given jobs in the new army, whilst the government also announced that they would be free to join the special forces and the navy too. According to Osama al-Juwali, the defense minister: "The idea is to inject new blood in the army which was marginalized by the tyrant (Gaddafi)"

General Yousef Mangoush said on 5 January 2012 that Libya's new army faces major obstacles such as rebuilding bases destroyed during the conflict, as well as disarming militas that were not part of the new army. National Army commander General Khalifa Hifter said later that it could take between three and five years for Libya to field a capable enough army to protect its borders.

Brigades 
No reliable estimate on the total strength of the Army exists. Training camps are being organized in Benghazi, Bayda and Ajdabiya attended by "thousands of men" according to a report of 3 to 6 March. The opposition force taking Brega and Ra's Lanuf during an advance of 2–4 March was estimated as numbering between 500 and 1,000 men. In the Nafusa Mountains alone there are up to 2,000 rebel fighters.

After being driven back to the outskirts of Benghazi, the Free Libyan Army took the offensive once more on 25 March. In a string of victories the rebels retook the cities of Ajdabiya, Brega, Ra's Lanuf and Bin Jawad and were advancing to Sirte. However, after being in position for 48 hours, they were forced to withdraw from Bin Jawad and Ra's Lanuf again. The front line was than in the region of Brega and Ajdabiya for several months, with additional front lines in Misrata and the Nafusa Mountains. In late August Rebels in the east were finally able to retake Brega and several other cities closing in on Sirte. At the same time rebels in Misrata were able to push out of the city and secured all surrounding towns, and rebels in the Nafusa Mountains were able to take most of the western coastline including Tripoli itself. Each soldier has also been given an ID card with photo, name, brigade-name, and their blood type. These ID cards are either in the form of paper in plastic slips or plastic cards.

Some of the Brigades reported on by International journalists are as follows:

Obaida Ibn Jarrah Brigade – Islamic extremist militia allegedly implicated in the assassination of National Liberation Army commander-in-chief Abdul Fatah Younis on 28 July 2011.
Okbah Ibn Nafih Brigade – Islamic extremist militia implicated in the detention of National Liberation Army commander-in-chief Abdul Fatah Younis in Brega's front on late July.
Omar Mukhtar Brigade – Based in Ajdabiya and numbering 200 men and 10 trucks.
Ali Hassan al-Jaber Brigade – Originally in Bayda, saw action during the Battle of Sirte (2011).
Jabal Martyrs Brigade – Based in Bayda and numbering 125 men.
Tripoli Martyrs Brigade – Based in Bayda.
Battalion Libya Free – Based in Bayda.
Bayda Martyrs Brigade – Based in Bayda.
Martyrs of Abu Salim – Based in Bayda.
Zawiya Martyrs Brigade – Based in the Nafusa Mountains, trained to take Zawiya
Shaheed Brigade – Based in and around Misrata, considered an elite unit in the rebel army
Misrata Brigade – Based originally in Misrata, reported as based in Tripoli as of August 2011.
Black Brigade – Based in and around Misrata
Swehdi Brigade – Based in and around Misrata
Al Horia Brigade – Based in and around Misrata, garrisoning Tawergha
Faisal Brigade – Based on the outskirts of Zliten
Arise Brigade – Based on the Libyan Coastal Highway between Misrata and Tripoli.
Tripoli Brigade – originally based in Nalut in the Nafusa Mountains and numbering 1,300 men. It is the elite of the rebel forces and was trained to take Tripoli, where it is currently based.
Abu Salim Brigade – Eastern Libya
Sabratha Brigade – Nafusa Mountains, trained to take Sabratha
Zuwara Brigade – Nafusa Mountains, trained to take Zuwara
Martyr Wasam Qaliyah brigade  – Western Libya composing up to 300 fighters
Coastal Brigade – Based on the Libyan Coastal Highway between Zawiya and Tripoli
Nalut Brigade – Based in Nalut, Nafusa Mountains
Kabaw Brigade – Based in the Nafusa Mountains, and took Tiji and Badr
Jadu Brigade – Based in Jadu and numbering 300 men
28 May Brigade – Based around Tripoli, composing of Warfalla Tribe Members and trained to take Bani Walid
Victory Unit –  Based on the road between Misrata and Bani Walid
Desert Shield Brigade – Liberated Sabha
Zintan Brigade – Fought for Sirte and during 2011 Nafusa Mountains Campaign.
Fursan Brigade – Based in Tripoli
Gharyan Brigade – Based in Gharyan
Kekka Brigade – Based in Tripoli and numbering 800 fighters.
Lions of the Valley Brigade – Based in Misrata, fought in Sirte.
11th Brigade – Based in and fought in Sirte.
Al-Ghiran Brigade – Based in Sirte and Misrata and was responsible for the capture of Muammar Gaddafi.
Khaled bin al-Waleed Brigade - Based in Zintan and was responsible for the capture of Saif al-Islam Gaddafi
Sabha Martyrs of Libya Brigade - Based near Sabha and claimed to be responsible for the capture of Abdullah Senussi.

Suppliers 
 –  Egypt has been reported to be supplying the rebels with mostly small arms such as assault rifles and ammunition.
 – France has acknowledged having sent arms to rebels in the Nafusa Mountains. These are rocket launcher, MILAN anti-tank missiles and guns and ammunition that have been sent.
  – The Polish Press Agency reported that unofficially the Polish government supplied the rebels with anti-tank rocket launchers and military vehicles and officers of Polish Special Forces in direct operations.
 – Qatar has been reported to be supplying the rebels with various kinds of weapons including MILAN anti-tank systems and AK-47 rifles (as many as 400 such rifles have been estimated to have reached the rebels). Qatar has also supplied the rebels with camouflage and armored vests.
 – Sudan supplied fighters in the Nafusa Mountains, Misrata, Kufra, and Benghazi with supplies, ammunition, and weapons Such as FN-FAL and AK-47 assault rifles.
 – The United Arab Emirates had been reported to be supplying the rebels with Belgian FN-FAL rifles and telecommunication network.
 – The United Kingdom supplied the rebel force with communication equipment and body armor in order to get the force more organised and define a central command structure.
 – The United States is moving to provide Libyan rebels with $25 million in medical supplies, radios and other aid that would not include weapons as stated by the Secretary of State Hillary Clinton.

Equipment 

The equipment of the National Liberation Army came primarily from abandoned Army depots, Libyan military defectors (notably in eastern Libya, Benghazi, Bayda, and Ajdabiya), Egyptian Armed Forces, France, Qatar and the United States. It is not exactly known what equipment was in use at the end of the war but reports from journalists reveal the following were in use (limited in some cases as in tank and armor because of unavailability of spare parts).

Camouflage
Camouflage clothing was provided by Qatar. Rebels were also seen in Ajdabiya wearing the military fatigues.

Pistols
  CZ99
  Glock 17
  Browning Hi-Power
  Beretta Model 70
  FN Five-seven
  Caracal F

Shotguns
  Benelli Vinci semi-automatic shotgun
 Over and under shotgun
 Side-by-side shotgun
  Benelli M4

Submachine guns
  MP 38
  Sterling Submachine Gun
 MAT-49
  Beretta M12
  MP5SD2
  FN P90 PDW

Carbines and rifles

  Zastava M93 Black Arrow anti-materiel rifle
  Zastava M21 17.000 assault rifle
  Carcano bolt-action rifle
  Heckler & Koch G36 assault rifle 
  Lee–Enfield bolt-action rifle
  Kar 98k bolt-action rifle
  AK-47 assault rifle (Other variants including AKM, Zastava M70, AK-63, AK-74, AK-103, Chinese Type 56, Romanian AIM and East German MPi assault rifles)
  AKS-74U assault carbine
  FN FAL battle rifle
  1B1 INSAS
  M4 carbine
  Norinco CQ assault rifle (a copy of the Colt M16 rifle)
  FN FAL squad automatic weapon

  FN F2000 assault rifle
  INSAS LMG
  M16 rifle assault rifle
 / HK G3 battle rifle (20,000 requested)

Machine guns and autocannons
  Zastava M02 Coyote Heavy machine gun
  M84 Light machine gun
  DP-28 Light machine gun
  RPK Light machine gun
  Ultimax 100 Light machine gun
  Daewoo Precision Industries K3 Light machine gun
  PKM General-purpose machine gun
  PKT re-purposed as portable machine guns
  Rheinmetall MG 3 General-purpose machine gun
  FN MAG General-purpose machine gun
  M1919A4 and M1919A6 Browning
  M2 and M3 .50 cal Heavy machine gun (Mainly mounted on Technicals)
  DShK 12.7mm Heavy machine gun (Mainly mounted on Technicals)
  NSV 12.7mm Heavy machine gun taken off of T-72 tanks (Mainly mounted on Technicals)
  KPV 14.5mm Heavy machine gun mounted on Technicals
  ZPU (ZPU-1,ZPU-2,ZPU-4) 14.5mm Anti-aircraft guns (Mainly mounted on Technicals but also on wheeled carriages)
  Hispano-Suiza HS.820 20 mm naval anti-aircraft autocannon mounted on Technicals
  ZU-23-2 23 mm anti-aircraft autocannons mounted on Technicals
  Gryazev-Shipunov GSh-23L 23 mm twin-barreled autocannon taken off of pro-Gaddafi force planes and mounted on Technicals
  Gryazev-Shipunov GSh-30-1 30x165mm autocannon taken off of pro-Gaddafi force planes
  Romanian M-1980/1988 30mm autocannon mounted on Technicals
  AZP S-60 57 mm autocannon

Sniper rifles
  OSV-96 Imported
  Dragunov SVD
  PSL (rifle)
  Truvelo 14.5x114mm and 20mm sniper rifles captured from the pro-Gaddafi forces

Rocket propelled, missiles and grenade systems

  M79 Osa shoulder-launched, anti-tank rocket-propelled grenade
  RPG-7 shoulder-launched, anti-tank rocket-propelled grenade launcher
  RPG-26
  RB M57 Yugoslavian shoulder-launched, anti-tank rocket-propelled grenade launcher
  SA-7 9K32 "Strela-2" MANPADS
  9K11 Malyutka (Sagger) anti-tank missiles
  MILAN anti-tank missiles
  9M123 Khrizantema supersonic anti-tank missiles
  Carl Gustav recoilless rifle
  SPG-9
  B-10 recoilless rifle
  M40 recoilless rifle mounted on jeeps and pickups with roof and windshield cut off
  Type 63 multiple rocket launcher (Mainly mounted on Technicals)
  122 mm multiple rocket launcher salvaged from damaged BM-21 Grad then divided into 3 to 8 tubes and mounted on Technicals
  S-5 rocket UB-16-57UMP, UB-32 rocket launchers
  Katyusha rocket launcher mounted on Technicals
  AGS-17 automatic grenade launcher
  F1 hand grenade
  RGD-5
  AN M18 Smoke grenade
  M2 mortar
  M1938 mortar
  122 mm howitzer 2A18 (D-30)
  130 mm towed field gun M1954 (M-46)
  155 mm towed field gun M114 howitzer

Vehicles

  T-34 - At least one seized during the war and placed at the main square in Garyan, according to Reuters. Current status unknown.
  T-55 main battle tank
  T-62 main battle tank
  T-72 main battle tank
  Type 59 main battle tank
  Centurion AVRE 105mm main battle tank, supplied by Jordan
  2S1 Gvozdika 122mm self-propelled artillery
  Palmaria 155mm self-propelled artillery
  BMP-1 Infantry fighting vehicle
  BMP-2 Infantry fighting vehicle
  BMP-3 Infantry fighting vehicle - 10 delivered from pre-revolution order.
  9P157-2 "Khrizantema-S" BMP-3 Anti-tank version with supersonic 9M123 Khrizantema (AT-15) system with radar and laser guidance - 14 in service; 4 pre-revolution, 10 delivered in October 2013.
  MT-LBu Armored personnel carrier
  BTR-60 Armored personnel carrier converted to MRLS for Type 63 multiple rocket launcher
  M113 Armored personnel carrier with ZU-23-2 23mm anti-aircraft autocannons mounted on top
  M577 command vehicle converted to Infantry fighting vehicle with 2A28 Grom turret from BMP-1 mounted on top
  Ratel 20 Infantry fighting vehicles with improvised ZPU-1 Anti-aircraft gun mounted on top, supplied by Qatar
  EE-9 Cascavel Armored car - Captured or salvaged by the Zawiya Martyrs Brigade in Sirte
  Nimr Armored car
  Humvee - 200 donated by the U.S. Army in July 2013.
  SA-6 Gainful
  SA-8 Gecko
  RM-70 multiple rocket launcher
  BM-21 Grad Multiple rocket launcher trucks
  AT-T
  S-125 Neva/Pechora
 Technicals (Armed with DShK, M2, M3, NSV, KPV, ZPU, ZU-23-2, GSh-23L, HS.820, 2A28 Grom with or without the turret taken off the BMP-1)

Aircraft

  MiG-21 Fighter jet aircraft – One MiG-21UM crashed after take-off from Benina airport due to technical malfunction.
  MiG-23 Fighter jet aircraft – one shot down by friendly fire over Benghazi.
  Soko G-2 Ground-attack and reconnaissance
  Mil Mi-2 light armoured utility helicopter
  Mil Mi-14 Anti Submarine Helicopter
  Mil Mi-24 Attack helicopter/Transport helicopter
Note: Both the Soko G-2, and Mil Mi-2 were captured at Misrata Airport on 24 February 2011.

Unmanned aerial vehicles (UAVs)
  1 Aeryon Scout Micro UAV

Ships

  1 Koni class frigate
 212 Al-Hani
  1 Nanuchka class corvette
 416 Tariq Ibn Ziyaad
  2 Natya class minesweeper

See also
Green Resistance
Alliance of Yemeni Tribes
Free Syrian Army
Armed Forces of the Libyan Arab Jamahiriya

References 

 
Guerrilla organizations
First Libyan Civil War
Rebel groups in Libya